James Lendale Steele Jr. (born October 4, 1974) is a former professional American football defensive lineman who played his entire six-year National Football League career with the Cincinnati Bengals. The Bengals selected him in the 1998 NFL Draft. He is also former All-American defensive end for the University of Michigan Wolverines football team and was a member of the undefeated national champion 1997 Michigan Wolverines football team.

Early life and college career
Steele attended West Noble High School, just outside Ligonier, Indiana. Steele, who wore No. 81 for the Michigan Wolverines, redshirted as a freshman in during the 1993 season and earned varsity letters in each of the subsequent four seasons from 1994 to 1997. He played for the 1997 Michigan Wolverines football team that won a national championship. He won the Richard Katcher Award as the top Michigan defensive lineman in 1997. Steele had 45 tackles for loss and 24 career quarterback sacks at Michigan, second most in team history at the time of his graduation. He was named a first-team selection to the 1997 All-Big Ten Conference football team and a first-team selection by the American Football Coaches Association to the 1997 College Football All-America Team.

Professional career
Steele was selected by the Cincinnati Bengals in the fourth round of the 1998 NFL Draft with the 105th selection overall.  Steele played in 80 consecutive games with the Bengals between 1999 and 2003 before being released on September 5, 2004.  Steele had signed with the New York Giants during the offseason following the 2003 season.  He was released on July 30, 2004 and signed by the Bengals who later released him.  He later tried out with the San Francisco 49ers.

See also
 List of Michigan Wolverines football All-Americans

References

External links
 Bentley Library biography and photograph of Steele
 

1974 births
Living people
American football defensive tackles
Cincinnati Bengals players
Michigan Wolverines football players
All-American college football players
People from Ligonier, Indiana
Players of American football from Indiana
Ed Block Courage Award recipients